Pietro Chiappini (27 June 1915 – 14 January 1988) was an Italian racing cyclist. He won stage 11 of the 1939 Giro d'Italia.

References

External links
 

1915 births
1988 deaths
Italian male cyclists
Italian Giro d'Italia stage winners
Sportspeople from the Province of Lucca
Cyclists from Tuscany